Baden Sharman (born 11 August 1939) is an Australian former cricketer. He played four first-class matches for Tasmania between 1967 and 1970.

See also
 List of Tasmanian representative cricketers

References

External links
 

1939 births
Living people
Australian cricketers
Tasmania cricketers
Cricketers from Tasmania